Killing Birds is a 1988 Italian horror film starring Lara Wendel and Robert Vaughn. The film is set in Louisiana where Fred Brown returns from the Vietnam war to find his wife in bed with her lover and slaughters the whole family sparing the newborn son. After the massacre, he is attacked by and blinded by a falcon. Twenty years later a group of students led by Steve and Anne meet Brown, and begin their search for a nearly extinct breed of woodpecker and come across grisly occurrences including boys being killed by vengeful zombies.

The film was first released in July 1988 in France, and in August in Italy.

Plot
Fred Brown, a soldier, returns to Louisiana from the Vietnam war to find his wife in bed with another man and kills them both and his parents, only sparing his son. While he is cleaning his knife, a falcon attacks him and tears out his left eye and blinds him in the other. He ends up at a hospital, where he says goodbye to the child before he is taken into foster care.

Twenty years later, a small group of college seniors, Steve Porter, Mary, Paul, Anne, Rob, Jennifer, and a local cop, Brian, are assigned to locate the Green-billed woodpecker, a rare species which will be officially extinct by 1992, four years after the current point of the movie. Steven and Anne meet with Fred Brown, who gives them a packet of information on the bird they're searching for. The group makes the former home of Brown their “base” for as long as they're searching, which turns up nothing on their first day other than a rotting corpse in an abandoned truck.

Upon settling in the house, strange occurrences, such as doors closing on their own and Steve seeing things that aren’t there, begin. These become more prevalent as time goes by, including a nightmare where Brown similarly kills Mary to how he killed his wife. While exploring the aviary she discovered earlier, Jennifer is chased into a tool shed by a zombie, only to be beaten to death by another hiding in there. Brian is burnt to death in a freak accident caused by the fuel leaking from the generator. Mary, who suspects it to be the man in her dream who killed Jennifer, finds her corpse.

The survivors make it to the camper only to realize that Brian had the keys. While Rob attempts to hotwire the camper, a zombie attacks and kills Mary. They quickly abandon the camper to make a last stand in Brown's house while Brown suffers a mild heart attack when he realizes what is happening. While trying to fix the generator, a door slams open and blows dust into the room, frightening Rob into running into the generator. His necklace is caught in the generator, and he is strangled to death when the wire cuts into his throat. Paul, who witnessed the whole thing and didn't help Rob, tells Steve and Anne that the zombies killed him.

It is revealed by an email sent by Brown to Rob's computer that Steve is the baby Brown spared twenty years earlier. A zombie breaks into the house and nearly kills Anne. However, Steve saves her at the cost of a shotgun he found. Steve, Paul, and Anne hide in the attic, where a fourth zombie attacks and results in the death of Paul when he panics.

In the morning, the zombies' attacks have ceased, allowing Steve and Anne to escape the house. They meet Brown, and he tells them to get out and that the zombies were never after Steven and Anne, only those of their group that showed fear of them. The credits begin to roll as Steve and Anne look away in despair when they hear Brown's scream emanate from the house. Their fates are not revealed.

Cast
Cast adapted from the book Italian Gothic Horror Films, 1980-1989.

Production

Pre-production
Claudio Lattanzi grew up dreaming of making films and met Dario Argento and Michele Soavi. Lattanzi assisted Soavi on his documentary film Dario Argento's World of Horror and was an assistant on his film Stage Fright. The producer of Stage Fright, Aristide Massaccesi then offered Lattanzi a chance to direct Killing Birds when Soavi turned down to offer to take up Argento's offer to make The Church.

According to Lattanzi, during the Christmas Holidays of 1986, he had written a story called Il cancello obsoleto about a record producer who invites a rock band to a deserted house to record a tune, without knowing that Nazi soldier corpses are buried there. Lattanzi stated that Massaccesi asked him to reshape the story by replacing the rock band and the Nazis with birds. Lattanzi said the new film would be titled Artigli which Massaccesi rejected, saying it sounded too much like it would be a documentary about cats.

A screenplay was then written by Daniele Stroppa with English dialogue revised by Sheila Goldberg. Claudio Fragasso and Rossella Drudi maintained conversely that Killing Birds - Raptors was from a story they wrote entitled Artigli. An Italian DVD of the film includes a PDF of the film with a 12-page treatment titled Artigli signed by Lattanzi and Bruna Antonucci, dated January 29, 1987, which Italian film historian Roberto Curti said was "very similar to the finished film" and dismissed Fragasso's and Drudi's claims.

The credited director on the film has been unclear, with many crew members stating that the film was actually directed by the producer Aristide Massaccesi (Joe D'Amato). Massaccesi stated in an interview "It seemed to me that the most sensible thing was to give the job of directing the dialogues to (Soavi's) assistant, Claudio Lattanzi, while I took care of the special effects scenes. In the end, I let (Lattanzi) sign as the director.

Filming and direction credit
Killing Birds was filmed on location in Thibodaux, Louisiana with a small crew of eight to nine members. The cinematographer was Massaccesi himself under the name Fred Sloniscko, Jr., one of his many aliases. The film "was shot with sync sound, and no overdubbing".

There is debate about who is the actual director of Killing Birds. Some sources state that Massaccesi directed the film, while Rossella Drudi said that Claudio Lattanzi was a front for the direction because Aristide could not be credited on too many films as a producer and director". Antonio Bonifacio, who is credited as the film's assistant director, remembered it differently, stating that D'Amato, after making Bonifacio himself the offer to direct (which he declined), then made Lattanzi, who had no idea how to direct a film, the offer to simply be credited and to be on set in case a journalist or anyone else dropped by, but that D'Amato would direct the film himself, which Lattanzi accepted. Bonifacio further stated that from the beginning, Lattanzi was simply there on set and watched while Massaccesi was directing, and that it therefore was not true that Massaccesi took over from Lattanzi at some later point. Similarly, scenarist Rossella Drudi remembered that it had been directed by D'Amato and not Lattanzi. Both these statements are corroborated by Massaccesi himself as cited, without any indication of date, in the Nocturno Dossier posthumously devoted to him, who said that he had directed it all by himself although he would have liked to continue his tradition of handing over directing to young directors, but that in the case of Lattanzi, there had been no such directorial agreement as with Fabrizio Laurenti or Michele Soavi. Lattanzi stated that he acknowledged Massaccessi's presence on the set but described the film as being directed  "in symbiosis" as well as that he should have the name on the film and specifically chose certain shots and scenes. Massaccesi opined that he personally took care of shots involving special effects, allowing Lattanzi to sign for the film.

Release
Killing Birds was released in France on 13 July 1988 as L'attaque des morts-vivants and later in Italy on 19 August 1988. Like other Filmirage films, Killing Birds had two versions prepared for it. One for foreign markets with more gore and effects, while the version released in Italy toned down the gore and replacing it with footage of close-ups of birds or actors. It was released under various titles to make it part of other film series on home video, this included the Italian DVD titled Killing Birds–Zombi 5, and in the United Kingdom as Zombie Flesheaters 4.

References

Bibliography

External links

Killing Birds at Variety Distribution

1988 films
1988 horror films
Films set in Louisiana
Films shot in Louisiana
Films directed by Joe D'Amato
Films scored by Carlo Maria Cordio
Italian zombie films
1980s Italian-language films
Italian sequel films
1980s Italian films